An arm ring, also known as an armlet or an armband, is a band of metal, usually a precious metal, worn as jewelry or an ornament around the biceps of the upper arm. The arm ring is similar to a bracelet or bangle, though it must be shaped and sized to fit snugly to the upper arm.

Historically, the arm ring was commonly worn by men, and often a "ring" in Bronze-Age heroic literature would refer to an arm ring, rather than a finger ring. Modern-day arm rings are generally fashion accessories worn by women.

In Indonesia, an arm ring is called kelat bahu; it is commonly used by both men and women as traditional jewelry in Javanese, Sundanese, and Balinese traditional costumes, worn usually in wedding ceremony or in traditional dance. The decorative arm rings are usually made of metals such as gold, silver, or brass, and can trace their history from the Indonesian Hindu-Buddhist past of ancient Java.

Sri Lankan history notes that brides wore armlets to ward off ill luck. However, the armlet can be more eye-catching when it is made of gold or silver and is studded with gems. Men in ancient Sri Lanka also wore the jewellery, and Kandyan drummers can be seen wearing the jewellery as a tradition even today. Women wear arm rings ('Vangi' in Tamil வங்கி) for special occasions like weddings and the Bharatanatyam dance.

Another similar item of jewellery includes a waistlet; these are sometimes referred to as belts.

See also

Armband

References

Armbands
Rings (jewellery)
Jewellery